Kandanga Creek is a rural locality in the Gympie Region, Queensland, Australia.

Geography 
Kandanga Creek, the creek from which the locality takes its name, rises in neighbouring Upper Kandanga and enters this locality from the south-west and flows through the locality exiting to the north-east (Kandanga), where it becomes a tributary of the Mary River.

The main land use is grazing on native vegetation.

History 
The locality takes its name from the creek, which is a Kabi word, koondangoor meaning mountainous.

Kandanga Creek Provisional School opened on 23 April 1900. On 1 January 1909 it became Kandanga Creek State School. It was mothballed on 31 December 2009 and closed on 31 December 2010. The school was on a  site at 249 Sterling Road. It was sold in November 2014 for $341,646. The school's website was archived.

Heritage listings 
Kandanga Creek has the following heritage listings:

 Kandanga Creek State School, 249 Sterling Creek Road
 Kandanga Creek Community Hall, 251 Sterling Road
 Former Kandanga Sawmill, 307 Sterling Road

Education 
There are no schools in Kandanga Creek. The nearest primary school is Kandanga State School in neighbouring Kandanga to the east. The nearest secondary school is Gympie State High School in Gympie to the north.

Amenities 
Kandanga Creek Community Hall is at 251 Sterling Road in John Doyle Memorial Park.

References

Further reading 

  — includes Kandanga Valley School

Gympie Region
Localities in Queensland